EAPC may refer to:

Euro-Atlantic Partnership Council
European Association of Political Consultants
Escola d'Administració Pública de Catalunya, a public administration school in Spain
Eilat Ashkelon Pipeline Company, also known as the Europe Asia Pipeline Company
Eurasian Patent Convention
Evangelical Assembly of Presbyterian Churches
Electrically Assisted Pedal Cycle, see Electric bicycle
European Association for Palliative Care